"Calling My Phone" is a song by American recording artists Lil Tjay and 6lack from the former's second studio Destined 2 Win (2021). It was released on February 10, 2021, through Columbia and Sony.

Background
The song was steadily teased by Tjay on Twitter and TikTok among other social media accounts starting in December 2020. Intended as a Valentine's Day gift to his fans, the artist announced the release of the single on February 4, 2021. A teaser for the song was released on February 5 revealing its title and release date and that an unknown feature will appear on the song. Speculations on the feature for the song began to spread and was eventually confirmed on February 8 on a Twitter post that the feature would be 6lack.

Composition
Generally, the "lovelorn" song talks about trying to escape "the grasp of a former lover, who can't seem to understand that the relationship has ended" while "Tjay wrestles with the demise of a relationship" and 6lack "holds down the hook". It was furthermore described as "introspective", with Tjay reflecting "on a relationship coming to an end over a slowed piano sample and moody bass, settling perfectly in that particular tone that Atlanta crooner 6lack thrives in."

Music video
The music video was released on February 12, 2021, and was directed by Cam Busby. It mainly features the rappers going through different situations while trying to move on from past relationships.
It has more than 138 million views as of April 2022.

Commercial performance
In the United States, "Calling My Phone" debuted at number three on the Billboard Hot 100 chart, becoming both Lil Tjay and 6lack's highest-charting single on the chart, also marking the first single for both of them to hit the Top 10.

Credits and personnel
Credits adapted from Tidal.

 Lil Tjay – vocals, songwriting, composition
 6lack – vocals, songwriting, composition
 Brendan Walsh – songwriting, composition, production
 Luis Campozano – songwriting, composition, production
 Ryan Martínez – songwriting, composition, production
 Eric Lagg – master engineering
 Barrington Hall – recording engineering
 JT Gagarin – recording engineering
Henock Siyoum – composition, melody

Charts

Weekly charts

Year-end charts

Certifications

References

2021 songs
2021 singles
6lack songs
Columbia Records singles
Canadian Hot 100 number-one singles
Lil Tjay songs
Songs written by 6lack
Sony Music singles
Songs written by Lil Tjay
American contemporary R&B songs